CM Almy is an American producer of clerical clothing founded in 1892 that serves mainly 
Episcopal, Lutheran, Presbyterian USA, and Roman Catholic ministries. Currently based in Armonk, New York, it is said to be the largest and one of the oldest producers of clerical clothing in the US. The current president of the family-run company is Stephen Fendler. Cardinal Timothy Dolan and the St. Patrick's Cathedral priests are clients.

Corporate structure
Stephen Fendler is president, and his brother Michael is the vice president of the company, running the manufacturing for the company in Maine. It has a showroom in Armonk, New York.

History
C. M. Almy & Son, Inc. was founded in New York City in 1892 by English master tailor Clarence Mortimer Almy and his son James. In 1929 James's cousin Donald Fendler took over the firm and guided it through the Depression and World War II. After the war, Donald was joined by his sons Thomas and Ryan who moved the shop to the town of Pittsfield, Maine.  Today, CM Almy is led by Ryan's sons Michael and Stephen.

In 2012, Fendler began researching into the needs of his female clients. He bought samples and looked at womenswear catalogs and hired a designer to sketch looks. He had the Rev. Anisa Cottrell in the Episcopal Diocese in Lexington, Kentucky advising. The result is that for fall 2013, he introduced a line of four new shirts made of stretchy knit for female clerics.

References

Clothing companies established in 1892
1892 establishments in New York (state)
Clothing companies of the United States
Companies based in New York (state)
Religious clothing